Diego Martin Central is a parliamentary electoral district in Trinidad and Tobago in the north-west of Trinidad. It has been represented since the 2020 general election by Symon de Nobriga of the People's National Movement (PNM).

Constituency profile 
The constituency was created prior to the 1981 general election. It borders the constituencies of Diego Martin North/East, Diego Martin West, and Port of Spain South. It contains a number of communities in Diego Martin, including Petit Valley, Diamond Vale, Four Roads and Blue Range. It had an electorate of 17,334 as of 2015.

Members of Parliament 
This constituency has elected the following members of the House of Representatives of Trinidad and Tobago:

Election results

Elections in the 2020s

Elections in the 2010s

References 

Constituencies of the Parliament of Trinidad and Tobago